Marcus Quintus Fabius Maximus Gurges may refer to::

 Quintus Fabius Maximus Gurges (consul 292 BC), Roman consul in 292 and 276 BC
 Quintus Fabius Maximus Gurges (consul 265 BC), son of the previous, Roman consul in 265 BC